Roy E. Furman (April 16, 1901 – May 18, 1977) was an American politician who served as the 21st lieutenant governor of Pennsylvania from 1955 to 1959 and as Speaker of the Pennsylvania House of Representative from 1936–1938.

Life and career 
Furman was born in Davistown, Greene County, Pennsylvania. Educated at Waynesburg College and owner of a construction company, he was elected to the Pennsylvania House of Representatives in 1932 and became Speaker of the House in 1936. He retired in 1940 to return to his construction business but remained politically active as chair of Greene County Democrats for ten years. He served as Lieutenant Governor of Pennsylvania from January 1955 to 1959 during Governor George M. Leader's administration. In 1958, Furman ran for the Democratic nomination for governor but lost to David Lawrence.

Furman served on the Pennsylvania Turnpike Commission during Governor Lawrence's term, later serving on the state transportation commission. Act 127 of 1975 designated Pennsylvania Route 21 as the “Roy E. Furman Highway.”

Furman retired to New Cumberland, Pennsylvania, and died in Harrisburg at the age of 76.

References

External links
The Political Graveyard
Indiana University of Pennsylvania Archives

1901 births
1977 deaths
Lieutenant Governors of Pennsylvania
People from Greene County, Pennsylvania
Speakers of the Pennsylvania House of Representatives
Democratic Party members of the Pennsylvania House of Representatives
20th-century American politicians
20th-century American businesspeople
Waynesburg University alumni